Stempfferia leonina, the western scalloped epitola, is a butterfly in the family Lycaenidae. It is found in Guinea, Sierra Leone, Ivory Coast, Ghana and Togo. The habitat consists of forests.

References

Butterflies described in 1888
Poritiinae
Butterflies of Africa
Taxa named by Otto Staudinger